Mr and Mrs Ryan is a 1986 American TV film. It was an early starring role for Sharon Stone.

It was a pilot for a TV series that did not eventuate. The pilot aired as a stand-alone TV movie.

"Sharon read for us and we just flipped," said Aaron Spelling. "The network said she wasn't sexy enough."

Aaron Spelling's daughter Tori had a small role.

Plot
A detective investigates crimes with the help of his socialite wife.

Cast
Sharon Stone as Ashley Hamilton Ryan
Robert Desiderio as Lieutenant Michael Ryan
Joseph Maher as Stockwell
Christine Belford as Margo Slater
David Fox-Brenton as Pershing
Jay Robinson as Auctioneer
Nicholas Worth as Kolvak
Fred Coffin as Beckerman
Walter Dalton as Sloan
John H. Evans as Officer
Garry Goodrow as Prisoner
Frank Birney as Harlan

References

External links
Mr and Mrs Ryan at IMDb
Mr and Mrs Ryan at BFI
Mr and Mrs Ryan at TCMDB

1986 television films
1986 films
Films directed by Peter H. Hunt